Ravi Vasant Patel (born December 18, 1978) is an American actor. He and his sister wrote and directed an autobiographical documentary, Meet the Patels.

Early life and education
Patel was born in Freeport, Illinois to Indian American parents, the son of financial consultant father Vasant Patel and real estate agent mother Champa Patel. He grew up in Charlotte, North Carolina and he graduated from the University of North Carolina at Chapel Hill in 2001 with double majors in Economics and International Studies. His sister, Geeta Patel, is a writer and director. An investment banker after college, Patel co-founded poker magazine All In while living in LA.

Career

Television and film 
An emcee job with improvised stand-up in between acts, led to auditions, Patel's first agent, and two dozen commercials in a year. He has been in over 70 national commercials, films and TV shows, most notably Transformers, Scrubs, It's Always Sunny in Philadelphia, The Comedians, and Hawaii Five-O.

In 2008-09, Patel appeared as George Patil in six episodes on The CW's Easy Money. In 2010, he starred in Past Life on Fox.

Patel co-directed and starred in Meet the Patels, a documentary that he made with his sister, Geeta Patel which won the audience award at the 2014 Los Angeles Film Festival. The film portrays Patel's autobiographical journey of trying to find an Indian wife. The duo have a deal with Fox Searchlight Pictures to write and direct a narrative remake of the film.

Patel worked in multiple episodes of the Aziz Ansari series Master of None. From 2015 to 2016, Patel appeared on the John Stamos TV series Grandfathered.

In 2020, Patel also created the CNN-produced docuseries Pursuit of Happiness'' which aired on HBO Max. Patel has also worked in Indian Cinema in the show Bhaag Beanie Bhaag.

Other
Patel is the co-founder of This Bar Saves Lives, which donates a meal packet for every granola bar they sell.  He is an active investor in start-ups in health and wellness.

Personal life 
Patel is married to actress Mahaley Patel with whom he has a daughter named Amelie.

Filmography

Film

Television

References

External links

Ravi Patel interview on the Tavis Smiley Show

1978 births
Living people
American male film actors
American male television actors
American male actors of Indian descent
Male actors from Illinois
People from Freeport, Illinois
University of North Carolina at Chapel Hill alumni